Pseudopostega longipedicella is a moth of the family Opostegidae. It was described by Donald R. Davis and Jonas R. Stonis, 2007. It is known from Puntarenas in Costa Rica and the Canal Zone in Panama.

The length of the forewings is 2.3–3.7 mm. Adults have been recorded in April.

Etymology
The species name is derived from the Latin longus (meaning long) and pedicellus (meaning small, slender stalk) in reference to the extremely long pedicel of the male valva.

References

Opostegidae
Moths described in 2007